A yi is a shape used in ancient Chinese ritual bronzes. It has the shape of half a gourd with a handle (often in the shape of a dragon) and usually supported by four legs. It is believed it was used to contain water for washing hands before rituals like sacrifices.

References 
 http://arts.cultural-china.com/en/30Arts2067.html
 http://arts.cultural-china.com/en/30Arts2015.html

External links
The great bronze age of China: an exhibition from the People's Republic of China, an exhibition catalog from The Metropolitan Museum of Art (fully available online as PDF), which contains material on yi

Chinese bronzeware